Castrillo de Riopisuerga is a municipality located in the province of Burgos, Castile and León, Spain. According to the 2004 census (INE), the municipality has a population of 87 inhabitants. Sites of interest include Lock 10 of the Canal de Castilla and the Church of St. Bartholomew.

Notes

Municipalities in the Province of Burgos